Automatic behavior is the spontaneous production of purposeless verbal or motor behavior without conscious self-control or self-censorship. This condition can be observed in a variety of contexts, including schizophrenia, psychogenic fugue, epilepsy (in complex partial seizures and Jacksonian seizures), narcolepsy, or in response to a traumatic event.

Automatic behavior can also be exhibited in REM sleep, during which a higher amount of brain stimulus increases dreaming patterns. In such circumstances, subjects can hold conversations, sit up, and even open their eyes. These acts are considered subconscious as most of the time the events cannot be recalled by the subject.

Automatic behavior may also manifest while performing well-learned actions. In this case, the behavior becomes automatic in the sense that it does not require conscious monitoring. The seemingly purposeful task is performed with no clear memory of it happening.

Early Automatism 
The interest in automatic behavior started in the 19th century after a huge spiritual movement was associated with uncontrollable body movements. Many people believed that uncontrollable movements such as table-turning, tilting, and screaming were signs of spirit possessions or that human bodies were being taken over by outside forces.

Many individuals started focusing on automatic behavior, such as the psychotherapist and psychologists Pierre Janet. Pierre Janet played an important role in studying the condition of dissociation related to automatic behaviors. Janet collected abnormal cases of automatisms and studied these cases with the idea that the patient's consciousness and unconsciousness were separated, causing behavioral changes and automatism. This approach to automatisms and the study of the conscious and unconscious part of the brain was inspired by the work of Sigmund Freud and William James; two investigators of hypnosis and hysteria.

At that time, automatism was a condition that many people faked. Indeed, scam artists use confidence tricks to depict fake spiritual possessions by making it seem like they weren't in control of their bodies. Interest in the spiritual movement eventually dropped in the early 20th century, however, scientists were always skeptical of the idea of automatism. There wasn't a concrete way to know if the sensation of losing control of the body felt by the individuals was real.

Conditions of Automatism 
There are many conditions for automatism. One example of this is dissociation, which is where consciousness and unconsciousness can be separated and change behavioral patterns. Dissociative symptoms that have been prevalent in many cases can be seen in people who have experienced blindness, deafness, anesthesia of various parts of the body, convulsions, possession, odd voices or sudden new habits, physical illness, and others. Dissociation can be connected to the use of hypnosis where involuntary actions are produced as a result. Hypnosis was closely connected to dissociation due to people being vulnerable to hypnosis whilst they were experiencing dissociative symptoms. Dissociation leads people to lose control over their actions as their consciousness and unconsciousness become separated.

Another condition of automatism is the expectation of attention. This is where someone has expectations that an action will be produced. For example, the use of a pendulum, during which as the person is holding the pendulum is attempting not to move it, the thought of it moving still crosses the mind. Expectation attention can therefore be described as expecting an action to occur, where our thought process is based on a movement we believe is bound to happen, creating this expectation. As our thought and action are connected, focusing on the expectation of such action is likely bound to happen. We can also see the "trolling for consistent action" being an effect in expectation attention. For example, when thinking of a specific feeling, such as coughing, as the thought lingers for a while we suddenly feel the urge to cough, clearing our throat and then eliminating such sensation. As this process plays out, we do not feel that we coughed due to the thought of doing so, as we aren't as aware of the thought in the first place. Expectation attention allows us to focus on our thought about action, even though our consciousness does not perceive us focusing on it, and so thought and behavior are separated.

Movement confusion is another condition of automatism, which is believing that it must be seen to believe that you are producing that action. For example, with the use of a pendulum, pushing a pendulum in a certain direction or pulling it in the opposite direction can contradict the original thought of the specific movement of the pendulum. As we can see the result of such action that we produce, it is harder to continue producing such action if it is opposite from our original idea of how the action will be produced. As it becomes harder to see the initial perceived action, the consistency of such action is being seen less, and the consciousness will soon become the unconsciousness of performing this action.

An outside agent can also be a condition of automatism. People subject to automatism will produce involuntary actions that were not controlled by their mental causation. To explain that phenomenon many will believe an outside factor is responsible for the action. Since the individuals don't have a conscious feeling of doing the automatic behavior, they automatically doubt that their mind could be responsible for it, pushing them to believe someone else, or something else, is causing their behavior. Many people link automatism with spirit possession for that reason.

Automatic Behavior in Seizures 
According to the book 'Brainstorm: Detective Stories From the World of Neurology' by Suzanne O'Sullivan, a side effect of focal seizures are uncontrollable movements, also known as automatism. O'Sullivan observed many automatisms in her patients such as purposeless swearing, spitting, uncontrollable clicking fingers, fumbling movements, and more. According to O'Sullivan, these symptoms are "an automatic release phenomenon that occurs because brain inhibition has been lost." The release of inhibition causes automatic behavior in other cases such as after a cingulotomy or even in the postictal phase of a seizure. In those cases, the patients having an epileptic seizure aren't in control of their bodies.

Usually, focal seizures from the temporal lobe or extratemporal seizure with cingulate cortex will generate automatic movements. The automatic behavior happens around five seconds after the seizure starts. It results from the spread of the seizure past its starting point. During a seizure, the cortical region of the brain can be activated, generating an automatic behavior.

Different automatic behavior can occur depending on what part of the brain is affected during the seizures. For instance, the electric stimulation of the cingulate, part of the cortex involved in behavior regulation, can create an automatic movement to the contralateral leg, lip, and face. If the patient has an effective automatism such as facial expressions that exhibit fear, the limbic motor region of the cingulate cortex is most likely impacted by the seizure. If the patient has an automatic behavior involving oral-alimentary like chewing or the movement of the appendicular skeleton such as picking up an object, this means the seizure activated the temporal lobe of the patient. Seizures can also impact the anterior cingulate causing the patient to have an uncontrollable ictal pouting also known as an inverted smile.

Spirit Possession Automatism 
The Ouija Board, is a flat board marked with the letters of the alphabet, the words "yes and no", numbers 0-9 as well as other graphics. The board uses a small heart-shaped piece of plastic or wood which is called a planchette. To use this board correctly, participants must place their fingers on the planchette to communicate with spirits. The action of the board can be explained by a psychophysiological phenomenon known as the Ideomotor Effect. The ideomotor effect, also known as the "Automatism Theory", is the idea that even though you may not know you are controlling the message indicator, you are. Most proponents of the Automatism Theory undertake the fact that it is probable to move the planchette unconsciously and declare that the Ouija board opens up a shortcut from the conscious to the subconscious mind.

The pendulum is a hand-held device usually containing a crystal and a chain. Crystals are often used as the weight stone since you could connect with them spiritually and cleanse them as needed. When using a pendulum, individuals begin to think about what questions they want to ask the pendulum, usually being yes or no questions. Usually, the pendulum will start moving in a specific pattern. The pendulum is linked to automatism as it is often believed to be caused by automatic behavior. Indeed, slight movement can make the pendulum move. In addition, thinking about the pendulum moving, can subconsciously push someone to move the pendulum and blame it on spirits. This is another case of the Ideomotor Effect as the individual is not aware of moving the pendulum.

Dowsing is a technique used to locate ground water, minerals, ores, gemstones, and many more by using a divining/dowsing rod. A divining rod usually consists of either tree branches or a forked rod, normally being hazelwood and V/Y/L shaped. With these rods, it is believed that when standing over a water source or minerals, the rods will spontaneously cross, or stick downwards. The scientific community criticizes this belief as they think dowsing is caused by an automatic behavior from the person dowsing. Indeed, subconsciously, the rods getting pushed together might be caused by the individual. This could be explained by the Ideomotor Effect as the individual is not aware they are causing the rods to move.

Alien hand syndrome 
Alien hand syndrome is an automatic behavior, first discovered in 1908, in which the person has uncontrolled behavior and observes his limbs moving without consciously having the capacity to control it. Often, it happens to be the left hand, since the right hemisphere is affected. There are a few different versions of alien hand syndrome that can occur, which are the Frontal Lobe version, the Callosal version, and the Posterior version. The frontal lobe version is the only version that affects the right hand of the individual. The callosal version involves the corpus callosum area of the brain. The posterior version involves the parietal lobe. The frontal, occipital, and parietal areas of the brain are also associated to this syndrome. It can occur after brain surgery, stroke, infection, tumor, aneurysm, migraine, having the two hemispheres surgically separated, Alzheimer's disease, Corticobasal degeneration, and Creutzfeldt--Jakob disease. Although anyone can fall victim to this, alien hand syndrome is a very rare side effect.

Dreams 
While the human body is sleeping, we are considered to be unconscious, but what happens to us when we are dreaming? Automatism can be illustrated within dreams, as the human brain does not need to think about dreaming, it simply happens. The brain is active during the REM (rapid eye movement) stage of sleep, when dreams occur, however this is only to portray the images we see in our dreams. Further analysis of this ideology can be seen in nightmares. Most humans do not want to have frightening dreams, still, we as individuals have no control over what we dream about. This is a prime example of why dreaming is considered an automatic behavior. Sleepwalking also comes around as a thought of automatic behavior found within the subcategory of dreams. What is happening to our bodies when we sleepwalk? Sleepwalking occurs in the frontal cortex responsible for rationality and the hippocampus used for memory. Scientists know this information from performing various tests on sleepwalking patients, such as EEG's and brain scans. It has been shown that sleepwalking relates to the natural human behavior of sleeping, although the frontal cortex is awake and ready to go. This can be seen in a lot of animal species, as this form of sleep where the frontal cortex is partially awake stems from an adaptation of enhanced survival. This is because the animals are ready to rise and defend against predators, and are less vulnerable while sleeping. While sleepwalking can be rather daunting and dangerous, it is something nobody can control, therefore considered a subclass of automatic behavior in dreams.

Everyday Automatism 
Everyday automatism is how someone can be affected in their everyday life due to the automatism they are experiencing. Even the most basic things done daily becomes extremely difficult- for example, showering, eating, and even breathing. Showering becomes difficult with the effects of nausea, paleness, and oral automatisms which can be triggered by the shower, through this automatism it is affected in the left temporal lobe. When the shower triggers this automatism, it triggers the left temporal lobe and causes these effects to happen to the individual experiencing these automatisms. Eating is another aspect of one's life that happens daily. Automatisms that are attached to eating can be triggered or caused by eating which can cause dizziness, impaired speech, jerking, and lip-smacking, without loss of awareness. All of those effects are provoked by eating or the mere thought of eating. Something so simple as breathing is affected due to automatisms, and the effects it can cause are shortness of breath, changes in respiratory rate and pattern, and reflexes such as coughing are triggered through automatisms. These are all examples of things someone does daily and possible side effects they can experience due to their epilepsy.

See also 
 Automatism (law)
 Automatism (medicine)
 Automatic writing
 Facilitated communication
 Homicidal somnambulism

References

Further reading
 
 
 
 
 
 

Symptoms and signs of mental disorders
Sleep disorders